Thiago dos Santos Cunha (born 25 April 1985) is a Brazilian-born Timorese professional footballer who plays as a forward for Náutico.

Career
Thiago was revealed in the academy of Barra da Tijuca and moved to Wigan Athletic Academy and had tickets for Brazilian clubs and abroad to get to Santa Cruz in 2008, where he was fast and good passing, scoring several goals. Then he was traded with Palmeiras.

His debut was in a game of Copa Sudamericana against Vasco on 17 September 2008. Palmeiras won the match by 3 × 0 with two goals of his own and eliminated the team from Rio who had won the first game 3–1.

Thiago has a contract with Brazil Sports, Traffic Team, which bought 70% of his economic rights of Iraty (SC).

In early 2010 he played for Nacional (PB) where he scored 11 goals.

He was loaned to Treze (PB) until the end of the 2010 Brazilian Serie D.

Chonburi F.C.
In 2012, Cunha completed his move to Chonburi F.C.

2012-13 season
In 2012 AFC Cup, Cunha was a hat-trick scorer for Chonburi F.C. in 2nd leg, before the team won the match against the Syrian side 4-2 Al-Shorta at Prince Mohammed Stadium, Zarqa (jordan)

Port F.C.
Despite a successful 2015 season where Chonburi finished fourth, at the end of the season Cunha announced he would be joining Thai Port F.C. despite the fact that the club had been relegated. on 29 August 2016 it was announced that Cunha was leaving Port F.C. after scoring five goals in 21 matches.

International career
In 2014 Cunha became a naturalized citizen of East Timor. On 19 January 2017, the Asian Football Confederation found, however, that he had a falsified Timorese birth or baptismal certificate.
Subsequently, they declared Cunha and eleven other Brazilian footballers ineligible to represent East Timor. In Cunha's case, he did not register international matches played for the Southeast Asian country.

Honours

Treze PB

 2010 – Campeonato Paraibano
Santa Cruz

 2011 – Campeonato Pernambucano

References
This article draws heavily on the corresponding article in the Portuguese-language Wikipedia.

External links

 Profile at Chonburi Official website
 

Living people
1985 births
People from Volta Redonda
Sportspeople from Rio de Janeiro (state)
Brazilian footballers
Association football forwards
Sociedade Esportiva Palmeiras players
Vila Nova Futebol Clube players
Clube Atlético Bragantino players
Santa Cruz Futebol Clube players
Guaratinguetá Futebol players
Treze Futebol Clube players
Thiago Cunha
Thiago Cunha
Mumbai City FC players
Campeonato Brasileiro Série A players
Campeonato Brasileiro Série B players
Campeonato Brasileiro Série D players
Thiago Cunha
Indian Super League players
Brazilian expatriate footballers
Brazilian expatriate sportspeople in England
Expatriate footballers in England
Brazilian expatriate sportspeople in Spain
Expatriate footballers in Spain
Brazilian expatriate sportspeople in Hungary
Expatriate footballers in Hungary
Brazilian expatriate sportspeople in Thailand
Expatriate footballers in Thailand
Brazilian expatriate sportspeople in India
Expatriate footballers in Indonesia
Brazilian expatriate sportspeople in Indonesia